Bible Analyzer is a freeware, cross-platform Bible study computer software application for Microsoft Windows, Macintosh OS X, and Ubuntu Linux. It implements advanced search, comparison, and statistical features of Bible texts as well as more typical Bible software capabilities. It received a high rating for version 4.4 from download.com. The Macintosh edition has also received positive reviews.

Overview
Bible Analyzer is written in Python with a wxPython GUI. According to its author it was first conceived in 2003 to address areas in Bible study and analysis that are largely untouched among other Bible software programs. Primarily features such as Bible text comparison, proximity range searches, and textual statistical analysis. Versions 1.0 through 2.2 concentrated on these features. The version 3 series greatly expanded them and added other features such as a dedicated cross-reference panel, "Related Verse" Searches, Text-To-Speech and Audio features, etc. Version 4.0 includes a major updating of the interface and also a Harmony/Parallel Text Generator, Advanced Related Phrase Search, Multiple Bible Search capabilities, exporting of study data to the "MultiWindow," etc. Version 4.5 introduced the "Session Manager" which allows the user to configure different sessions of modules for various types of studies.

Version 4.7 introduced some original and unique capabilities. Along with the optional Authorized Version People Edition Bible, Bible Analyzer can search for specific individuals using an ID tagging system. Each person in the Bible (as well as all references to deity, including pronouns) is tagged with a unique ID to enable individual searching. For instance, any one (or more) of the six Marys in the Bible can be found at the exclusion of the others. Furthermore, references to deity, such as pronouns, alternate designations, etc., other than by name (God, Jesus, Christ, etc.) can be used as search criteria.

Versions 4.8 and 4.9 introduced among other enhancements a built in Download Manager with which all free and premium modules can be downloaded directly into the program.

Module format
Bible Analyzer utilizes Bible, Commentary, Dictionary, Book and Image modules in the open-source SQLite database format. Users can easily create custom modules with the built in "Module Creator." There are scores of free and premium modules available from the Bible Analyzer website.

Bible Analyzer has in its module format such works as E. W. Bullinger's Companion Bible Notes and Appendices in fully searchable, digital format, the 11 volume Understanding The Bible Commentary by David Sorenson, Books and Charts by Clarence Larkin such as Dispensational Truth, the 23 volume Pulpit Commentary, the 43 volume Expositor's Bible, the 56 volume Biblical Illustrator, and many more.

Bible Analyzer is updated regularly and a CD-Rom with over 1200MB of data is available.

History of Bible Analytics
The Pioneer of Bible Analytics was Thomas Hartwell Horne (1780–1862), a theologian and librarian. He was born in London and educated at Christ's Hospital. His work named, 'Introduction to the Critical Study and Knowledge of the Holy Scriptures' that was published in 1818 was the beginning of the Bible Statistics. Horne also produced a "Tree Full of Bible Lore," a tree-shaped text of statistics on the Bible, in which he counted the number of books, chapters, verses, words, and even letters. He ended this tree with "It the Bible contains knowledge, wisdom, holiness and love." This "tree" is reproduced in the third series of Ripley's paperbacks, originally published hardbound in 1949. Although he was very wrong with his statistics, it was the beginning...

Reviews
Bible Software Review, Review of Bible Analyzer version 3.5.2
Download.com, Review
Baptist Basics
Bible Software Review, Bible Analyzer For Macintosh

See also

Biblical scholarship and analysis
 Dating the Bible
 Textual criticism
 Historical criticism
 Documentary hypothesis
 Synoptic Gospels
 Biblical manuscripts
 Internal consistency of the Bible
 Mosaic authorship
 Authorship of the Johannine works
 Authorship of the Pauline epistles
 Non-canonical books referenced in the Bible
 Apocrypha
 Dead Sea Scrolls
 Nag Hammadi library
 Biblical archaeology

Perspectives on the Bible
 Bibliolatry
 John Calvin's view of Scripture
 Jewish Biblical exegesis
 Islamic view of the Bible
 Biblical narratives and the Quran
 Criticism of the Bible
 Gnosticism and the New Testament
 Good News (Christianity), concerning the content of the Bible's message about Jesus
 Christianity and Judaism
 Biblical law in Christianity
 Bible prophecy
 Biblical inerrancy
 Life of Jesus in the New Testament
 Ten Commandments
 Parashah
 Ritual Decalogue
 Jewish messianism
 Christian eschatology
 Bibliomancy is the use of random readings from a book for divination. When practiced in Jewish and Christian cultures, the Bible is often used.
 Bible conspiracy theory
 Bible code

Interpretation
 Biblical literalism
 Biblical hermeneutics
 Midrash
 Pardes (Jewish exegesis)

History and the Bible
 The Bible and history
 Chronology of the Bible
 Hebrew Bible: Timeline
 English translations of the Bible
 Code of Hammurabi
 Study Bible
 List of burial places of biblical figures
 List of artifacts significant to the Bible

Biblical topics
 Alcohol
 Circumcision
 Crime and punishment
 Ethics
 Homosexuality
 Murder
 Slavery
 Women

Bible societies
 See Bible society for a list.

Commentaries
See Biblical exegesis.

Religious texts
 List of Religious texts

References

External links

 
 Home Page of author, Timothy Morton

Electronic Bibles
Bible versions and translations